Levent Eriş (born 17 September 1962) is a UEFA Pro Licensed Turkish football manager and former player.

References

1962 births
Living people
Turkish footballers
İzmirspor footballers
Samsunspor footballers
Alanyaspor footballers
Bucaspor footballers
Karşıyaka S.K. footballers
Association football midfielders
Turkey under-21 international footballers
Turkish football managers
İzmirspor managers
Manisaspor managers
Kayseri Erciyesspor managers
Altay S.K. managers
Diyarbakırspor managers
Samsunspor managers
Adana Demirspor managers
Giresunspor managers
Boluspor managers
Adanaspor managers